The 2004 Peach Bowl may refer to:

 2004 Peach Bowl (January), January 2, 2004 game between the Clemson Tigers and the Tennessee Volunteers
 2004 Peach Bowl (December), December 31, 2004 game between the Florida Gators and the Miami Hurricanes